Henry Hippisley Coxe (1748-1795) of Ston Easton Park, Somerset, was MP for Somerset (1792-5).

Origins
He was the 3rd son of John Hippisley Coxe (1715-1769), builder of the mansion house Ston Easton Park, by his wife Mary Northleigh, daughter and eventual sole-heiress of Stephen Northleigh, MP, of Peamore, Exminster, and of Matford, Alphington, Devon.

Inheritance
In 1786 he became heir to Ston Easton Park and other estates on the death of his elder brother Richard Hippisley Coxe (1742-1786), MP.

Career
He served in the  Somerset Militia, as Lieutenant in 1778, Captain in 1782 and Major in 1795. He was Sheriff of Somerset 1789-90 and  MP for Somerset (1792-5).

Marriages
He married twice:
Firstly in 1786 to Sarah Pole (d.1787),  daughter of Reginald Pole of Stoke Damerel, Devon, without progeny.
Secondly in 1790 to  Elizabeth Anne Horner (d.1843), daughter of Thomas Horner of Mells Park, Somerset, without progeny. She was said to have been "of masculine character, having at some time or other expressed a wish to be made a justice of the peace". She survived her husband and remarried to Sir John Coxe Hippisley, 1st Baronet (1746-1825), who despite the similarity in name, was of distant, if any, relation to her former husband.

Succession
He died without progeny on 1 August 1795, and left his estates to his widow Elizabeth Anne Horner for life, with remainder to his nephew Rev. Henry Hippisley, 2nd son of his sister Margaret Hippisley Coxe by her husband Rev. John Hippisley (1735-1822) of Lambourne Place, Berkshire.

Sources
Aspinall, Arthur, biography of Coxe, Henry Hippisley (1748-95), of Ston Easton, Somerset, published in The History of Parliament: the House of Commons 1790-1820, Thorne, R., (ed.), 1986
Burke's Genealogical and Heraldic History of the Landed Gentry, 15th Edition, ed. Pirie-Gordon, H., London, 1937, pp. 1119–20, pedigree of Hippisley of Ston Easton

References

1748 births
1795 deaths
Members of the Parliament of Great Britain for English constituencies
British MPs 1790–1796
High Sheriffs of Somerset